Raúl Valderrama (24 March 1913 – 1999) was a Peruvian sports shooter. He competed in the 25 m pistol event at the 1948 Summer Olympics.

References

External links
 

1913 births
1999 deaths
Peruvian male sport shooters
Olympic shooters of Peru
Shooters at the 1948 Summer Olympics